Love and Other Catastrophes is a quirky 1996 Australian romantic comedy film featuring Frances O'Connor, Radha Mitchell, Alice Garner, Matthew Dyktynski, Matt Day and Kym Gyngell. The film was the first full-length release by director Emma-Kate Croghan and is set and filmed at Melbourne University where she studied writing and film directing.

The film was nominated for five Australian Film Institute awards, including best film, best original screenplay, best actress, best supporting actress, and editing. Garner won a Film Critics Circle of Australia award for best supporting actress for her role in the movie.

At the ARIA Music Awards of 1997 the soundtrack was nominated for Best Original Soundtrack, Cast or Show Album.

Plot
The story revolves around University of Melbourne film studies students and roommates Mia (Frances O'Connor) and Alice (Alice Garner), each of whom is experiencing various upheavals. Mia and Alice have just moved into a trendy apartment but are in desperate need of a housemate. Mia's girlfriend Danni (Radha Mitchell) is keen to move in, but Mia fears commitment.

Obsessed with her favourite lecturer, Mia becomes embroiled in a war of paperwork with the university administration as she attempts to pursue him to his new department. She is hampered in her efforts to transfer by her current supervisor Professor Leach (Kym Gyngell). To add to her woes she then breaks up with her girlfriend, Danni. Danni pursues another love interest, in part to get back at Mia.

Alice, a habitual perfectionist, is four years late with her thesis on 'Doris Day as Feminist Warrior'. She is looking for the perfect man but can't find anyone who fits her strict criteria. Frustrated, she falls for the most unsuitable male possible... Ari (Matthew Dyktynski), a classics student and part-time gigolo. However she is the object of desire of shy medical student, Michael (Matt Day).

As the day ends and the party begins events begin to unscramble in unexpected ways. Omnia Vincit Amor... Love Conquers All.

Cast
 Matt Day as Michael Douglas
 Matthew Dyktynski as Ari
 Alice Garner as Alice
 Frances O'Connor as Mia
 Radha Mitchell as Danni
 Suzi Dougherty as Savita
 Kim Gyngell as Professor Richard Leach
 Suzanne Dowling as Dr. Russell
 Torquil Neilson as Toby
 Christine Stephen-Daly as Susan
 Dominic McDonald as Zac
 Alvin Chong as Alvin
 Myles Collins as Myles
 Antony Neate as Tony
 Brigid Kelly as Brigid

Music
Love and Other Catastrophes features music by many bands including:

 Daryl McKenzie – "Manhattan Walk"
 Velvet Underground – "Sunday Morning"
 The Cruel Sea – "Just a Man"
 Dave Graney & The Coral Snakes – "You're Just Too Hip Baby"
 Underground Lovers – "Recognize"
 Godstar – "Pushpin"
 Rebecca's Empire – "Empty"
 Tumbleweed – "TV Genocide"
 Spdfgh – "Steal Mine"
 Tex, Don and Charlie – "Fake That Emotion"
 Monday Michiru – "Rainy Daze"
 The Boners – "Perils of Mia"
 The Cardigans – "Carnival"
 Bellydance – "Bubbles (Pigs Will Fly)"
 Blue Mink – "Can You Feel It Baby"
 Simon Holmes and Morgana Ancone – "Let's Do It (Let's Fall in Love)"
 Died Pretty – "Good at Love"

Box office
Love and Other Catastrophes grossed $1,687,929 at the box office in Australia,.

See also
 Cinema of Australia

References

External links
 
 
Love and Other Catastrophes at Oz Movies
 
 Roger Ebert review
 Love and Other Catastrophes at the National Film and Sound Archive

1996 films
1996 independent films
1996 romantic comedy films
Australian LGBT-related films
Australian romantic comedy films
Australian independent films
Films shot in Melbourne
Fox Searchlight Pictures films
LGBT-related romantic comedy films
1996 LGBT-related films
1990s English-language films